Chester See (born Chester Lionel Watch April 20, 1983) is an American YouTuber, singer and actor. He is best known for his YouTube videos, which have garnered over 207 million views, as of September 2017. He appeared as Stacee Jaxx in Rock of Ages on Broadway from October 2014 through January 2015.

Career
In 2006 See hosted Disney 365, an entertainment news program on the Disney Channel, which ran until 2009.

See started his ChesterSee YouTube channel in 2007 after having some success writing lyrics for Warner/Chappell. The channel primarily consists of comedy sketches, short films and cover songs. He is part of the Maker Studios multi-channel network. In 2011, See, alongside YouTubers Nigahiga and Kevin Wu uploaded a music video titled Nice Guys. In 2012, See, alongside YouTubers Nigahiga and Kevin Wu, also film director Justin Lin, started the YOMYOMF YouTube channel. The channel released an internet-only reality TV talent show called Internet Icon later that year; See hosted the first season. Later in the year, See was a contestant on season 2 of D-trix's Dance Showdown.

In 2013 See was the executive producer for online-only NBC and AwesomenessTV produced musical comedy series Side Effects; he also starred as Keith in eight episodes over two seasons. The following year See was cast as Jeff Sanford in the comedy film Camp Takota, in a supporting role alongside Grace Helbig, Mamrie Hart and Hannah Hart. See starred as Stacee Jaxx in a Broadway production of Rock of Ages from October 27, 2014 through January 4, 2015. See will appear in the 2015 Relativity Digital and FilmOn feature film, Bob Thunder: Internet Assassin. In 2018, he made a guest appearance on the tenth season of RuPaul's Drag Race, where he was given a drag makeover by contestant Miz Cracker. He and Cracker won the challenge and was given a Klein, Epstein, and Parker $2,000 gift card as a prize.

, See has produced over 400 YouTube videos and has over 1.9 million subscribers to his YouTube channel ChesterSee and over 275 million video views. As of August 2014, he has sold over 500,000 songs on iTunes. See is influential through social media, with over 200,000 followers on both Twitter and Instagram .

Awards and nominations
See was nominated for two Streamy awards in 2013 at the 3rd Streamy Awards, under the "Best Online Musician" and "Audience Choice Finalists for Personality of the Year" categories. He received a further four nominations in 2014, winning the "Original Song" category for his song "Whistle While I Work It" in collaboration with Toby Turner and Wayne Brady. He was also nominated in the "Best Collaboration" (for his cover of "No Diggity" by Blackstreet with Flula Borg), "Best Cover Song" (for his cover of "Roar" by Katy Perry with Andy Lange, Andrew Garcia and Josh Golden) and "Best Musical Artist" categories.

In 2014, See's YouTube Channel was listed on New Media Rockstars Top 100 Channels, ranked at #44.

Education
See graduated from UCLA in 2005 with a BA in Economics and Theater Arts.

Filmography

Film

Television

Theatre

References

External links
 
 

21st-century American male actors
21st-century American singers
American Internet celebrities
American male musical theatre actors
Place of birth missing (living people)
1983 births
American musicians of Chinese descent
Singers from California
Living people
Male actors from California
University of California, Los Angeles alumni
21st-century American male singers